James Johnson (26 March 1923 – May 1987) was an English professional footballer who played as a forward.

References

1923 births
1987 deaths
Footballers from Stockton-on-Tees
Footballers from County Durham
English footballers
Association football forwards
York City F.C. players
Grimsby Town F.C. players
Carlisle United F.C. players
English Football League players